Lake Moultrie is the third largest lake in South Carolina. It provides a wide variety of recreational opportunities, including fishing.

Location

Lake Moultrie is located in Berkeley County, South Carolina. It is fed by the Cooper River through Lake Marion and a diversion canal. 

Nearby towns include Moncks Corner, Bonneau, Cross, and St. Stephen.

Origin
Lake Moultrie was created in the early 1940s by the South Carolina Public Service Authority. It was formed by construction of Pinopolis Dam on the Cooper River, as part of a flood control and hydroelectric power project. It was named for Governor William Moultrie. The reservoir or lake offers extensive recreational opportunities as well.

Fishing
Lake Moultrie offers a varied fishing environment. It has areas of shallow swamps, black water ponds, thousands of tree stumps and live cypress trees, as well as large open areas of water. This lake does not form ice in the winter. A world record channel catfish weighing  was caught from this lake. The lake also holds the state record for black crappie (5 lbs).

See also 

 Lake Marion
 List of lakes in South Carolina

References

External links 
 

Protected areas of Berkeley County, South Carolina
Moultrie
Santee River
Bodies of water of Berkeley County, South Carolina
1940s establishments in South Carolina